Point Break were a British pop group, formed and managed by Danielle Barnett and signed to WEA, who found brief success between 1999 and 2000. Launched as a new boy band in 1999, the group featured Brett Adams and David "Ollie" Oliver, who had both acted in TV's Byker Grove, and Declan Bennett. Within a year, they clocked up five UK hit singles and an album. Other members included American Dustin Strong, who joined the group as a singer and songwriter and toured live with Point Break before the group disbanded.

Discography

Albums

Singles

References 

British pop music groups
English boy bands
Musical groups established in 1999
Musical groups disestablished in 2000
1999 establishments in the United Kingdom